"Don't Say" is a song recorded by Taiwanese Mandopop singer-songwriter William Wei. The song was written by Wei as the opening theme song for the television series To the Dearest Intruder. It was released as a single by Linfair Records on September 1, 2015.

"Don't Say" received positive reviews and was a commercial success. At the 2015 KKBOX Year-end chart, "Don't Say" was the 11th most streamed song in Taiwan. 

The music video was directed by Howard Kuo and Allan Shen and was released on November 3, 2015.

Background and composition
Written by Wei, "Don't Say" is a pop ballad that talks about the end of a relationship. In a radio interview, Wei siad that the inspiration of the song came from the movie Eternal Sunshine of the Spotless Mind, which focuses on two lovers who have each other erased from their memories when their relationship turned sour. Wei believed that one should never relinquish the memories of the other half, no matter how unbearably painful they are. Without the bad ones, we would never be able to appreciate the good ones.

Music video
The music video for "Don't Say" was directed by Howard Kuo and Allan Shen. It premiered on YouTube and QQ Music on November 4, 2015. The video begins with Wei boarding a bus. He sits at the back and starts observing a girl who appears to be upset. The girl later receives a text message from her boyfriend, asking if she loves him. Inspired by the scene he saw, Wei starts writing lyrics on his notebook. After much struggle, the girl decides to tell her boyfriend that she does not love him at all. As the bus reaches the terminal, Wei stands up and prepares to get off. Before the video ends, Wei takes one last look at the girl and decides to change a line of the lyrics that he has written.

Live performances
Wei performed "Don't Say" on a number of shows. Wei performed the song for the first time at his "Free That Girl" concert, held at Taipei Arena. Wei also performed the song at the KKBOX Music Awards and QQ Music Awards. The song was also included on Wei's set list for his 2016 New Year Countdown performances at Taipei, Janfusun Fancyworld and Fulong Beach.

Awards and nominations

References

2014 singles
William Wei songs